is a shōjo manga as well as a PlayStation 2 Otome Game. The manga was created at the same time as the video game, and was drawn by Shiori Yuwa and published in Hana to Yume & The Hana to Yume.  The video game used the same character designs and plot in a love simulation published by Capcom in 2004. A sequel to the video game, called Full House Kiss 2, was released in 2006.

Plot

Suzuhara Mugi is a 15-year-old on a mission. She is determined to somehow get onto the campus of Shoukei high school, one of those super, super elite high schools. This school is huge and private and has tight security. Mugi is searching for her missing sister—her only remaining family—and she has been led to believe that someone or something on the campus of that school will help her in her search. Unfortunately the strict school security is preventing her from getting onto the school grounds.

However, her luck changes when she literally runs into Midou-kun, the son of an insanely rich mega-corporation president, and elite person at the school. Midou is not impressed with Mugi's sob story about needing to get into that school. He is a very smug and arrogant rich guy. But he can be reasonable, and he eventually strikes up a deal with Mugi—he will get her onto the school grounds in exchange for some labor on her part, that she must come to his house and work as a maid! He lives with 3 other guys, known as the La Princes in the super elite school.

Her brave optimistic cheerfulness holds an attraction for all. As the manga progresses, the romance starts surfacing. While striving to unravel the mystery of her sister who eloped, she becomes a darling of the four. Hanekura has revealed his feelings many times indirectly, unlike Sei who is very straightforward and was the first person to ask her out. Kazuya is not sure about his feelings, but has always been protective of her. It was revealed that Iori has feelings for her too: when Mugi asked him if he is in love with someone right now, Iori answered by giving her a peck on forehead and telling her that he will try not to get mixed up in that.

Characters

Principal female characters
Mugi Suzuhara

She lost her parents and is looking for her sister who has disappeared. The only clue is Shoukei High School and there she meets Kazuya Midou who helps her, and asks her to be a maid, in exchange,  he will help her to enter Shoukei High to investigate about the disappearance of her sister. She accepts the conditions and becomes a fake art teacher, whilst being a maid for four cute guys. When the series progresses she starts to have feelings for Kazuya. She is referred as "Princess" by Iori.

Nae Suzuhara
Mugi's missing older sister. Some people think she eloped.  it appears she might have disappeared with Shoukei Gakuen's Andou-san...but?!

Natsumi Okazaki
Mugi's best friend from her childhood. She's the daughter of the Okazuki Construction Company's president and has always been worrying about Mugi. She started going to Shoukei Gakuen not long before Mugi became the art teacher there. She also knows that Mugi entered the school to look for her missing sister and that she lives with the princes.

Princes of Shoukei Academy
Kazuya Midou

3rd yr
Heir to the Midou Group who aims to become the managing director of it. He is the one that had asked Mugi to become a maid in the house he lived in, in exchange of him helping her out with finding her sister. He seems to be perfect at everything, one of the top students in the nation... but is that really the case?!

Iori Matsugawa
19yrs old, 3rd yr

He comes from a prestigious family of Kabuki actors and started out playing female roles. Due to his adult-like manner he's incredibly popular with the ladies. He thinks that one day everyone will love him, and treats Mugi like a princess.

Asaki Hanekura

Heir to the Hanekura Bank. He likes playing billiards and riding his motorbike. He used to hate women till he met Mugi, who made him think otherwise.

Sei Ichimiya

A genius pianist and violinist. Loves playing pointless pranks. He likes to hug Mugi, even if she feels embarrassed every time he does this.

Gameplay
Most of the gameplay is focused on housekeeping tasks.  Every day after you get back from school, you have chores asked of you by each household member and a finite amount of time to get them done.  You do them well or badly depending on choices you make.  At the end of the evening,  the boys all visit you to report on how you did.

In addition to the chores, you can also 'encounter' the boys in rooms around the house, which can lead to some minigames or just dialogue.

The larger aspect of the game is solving your sister's disappearance.  This is done while you're at school, and after school hours.  You have to act like a teacher to keep suspicion away, but you also have to investigate.

There is also the dating aspect.  Doing the chores well will increase your standing with characters, as will successfully completing the relevant minigame.  There are also some scenes with the boys where you have to choose your reactions, which will also make a difference.  There are also some events which you can do with one of the boys, usually the one that you have the highest standing with.

References 

2004 video games
2004 manga
Capcom franchises
Hakusensha franchises
Hakusensha manga
Japan-exclusive video games
Otome games
PlayStation 2 games
PlayStation Network games
Shōjo manga
Video games developed in Japan